A statue of American baseball player Willie McCovey was installed in McCovey Cove, San Francisco. It was unveiled in 2003.

The statue was removed by San Francisco Giants and put into safe storage in July 2020. It will be put back in public display in 2023.

References

2003 establishments in California
2003 sculptures
Monuments and memorials in California
Outdoor sculptures in San Francisco
Sculptures of men in California
Sculptures of sports
Statues in California